Gerald James Bordelon (February 19, 1962 – January 7, 2010) was an American convicted murderer and sex offender who was executed in Louisiana for murder. Bordelon was sentenced to death for the kidnapping and murder of Courtney LeBlanc, his 12-year-old stepdaughter. Bordelon waived his appeals and asked to be executed, saying he would commit a similar crime again if he was ever given the opportunity. Bordelon was executed at Louisiana State Penitentiary on January 7, 2010, becoming the first person executed in Louisiana since 2002 and the state's first voluntary execution. He remains the last person executed in Louisiana.

Early life
Bordelon was born on February 19, 1962, and grew up in Louisiana. He attended schools in the Baton Rouge area and was considered impaired. As a result, he was put in a special resource class, before his mother took him out of school altogether after the principal advised her to. Doctors believed Bordelon suffered from antisocial personality disorder and sexual sadism disorder but had an IQ in the normal range.

On March 17, 1982, Bordelon offered an 18-year-old woman a ride home in his car. After she got in, he pulled out a knife, took her to a house, and forced oral sex on her. In 1982, he pleaded guilty to sexual battery and was sentenced to ten years in prison. On June 14, 1990, he kidnapped another woman at knife point, and took her to an abandoned building where he forced oral sex on her and raped her. In 1990, Bordelon was convicted of forcible rape and two counts of aggravated crime against nature and sentenced to 20 years in prison.

Murder
In 2000, Bordelon was released on parole and began working at Delta Concrete. In late 2000, he began communicating over the Internet with a woman named Jennifer Kocke. Despite knowing about his criminal history as a sex offender, Kocke married Bordelon in July 2001. The family then moved to Gloster, Mississippi, in October 2001, living in a trailer on land owned by Bordelon's parents. During Christmas period in 2001, Kocke's daughters, one of whom was Courtney LeBlanc, told her that Bordelon had molested them. Kocke alerted child protective services in Mississippi and Bordelon was forced to leave. The couple then separated and Kocke returned to Louisiana with her family. Despite this, she remained in contact with Bordelon.

On November 15, 2002, 12-year-old Courtney LeBlanc disappeared from her home in Denham Springs, Louisiana. Kocke discovered she was missing when she returned home and  immediately called the police. Initially it was believed that LeBlanc may have just run away from home. As the investigation continued, police were concerned that LeBlanc may have fallen victim to serial killer Derrick Todd Lee, who was operating in the area at the time, but this theory was later dismissed.

Investigation then focused on Bordelon and he was placed under surveillance. He was questioned by police and eventually admitted to kidnapping and murdering LeBlanc. On November 26, 2002, Bordelon led investigators to LeBlanc's body. He confessed to the murder and said he had abducted LeBlanc from her home with a knife. He took her to Mississippi where he forced oral sex on her, before driving her back to Louisiana. Upon returning, he strangled her to death on a bank near the Amite River. He then dumped her body in a wooded area in Livingston Parish.

Trial
Bordelon was charged with first-degree murder and second-degree kidnapping for the death of LeBlanc. He was found guilty of first-degree murder on June 29, 2006, and was sentenced to death the following day. After being sentenced, he waived his appeals and asked that his execution be carried out. According to court documents, he said he would commit a similar crime again if he was ever given the opportunity.

In October 2003, Jennifer Kocke was found guilty of felonious child abuse in connection with the murder of LeBlanc. She was sentenced to a suspended five-year term with five years probation.

Execution
On January 7, 2010, Bordelon was executed via lethal injection at Louisiana State Penitentiary in West Feliciana Parish, Louisiana. He was one of three people executed in the United States on that specific day. The others were Vernon Lamont Smith in Ohio and Kenneth Mosley in Texas. They were the first three people to be executed in the United States in 2010. The executions of three or more people within a single day is something that has not occurred in the United States since.

In Bordelon's last statement, he apologized to LeBlanc's family as well as his own. His last meal was fried sac-a-lait fish, topped with crawfish étouffée, a peanut butter and apple jelly sandwich, and chocolate chip cookies. He was pronounced dead at 6:32 p.m.

As of 2021, Bordelon remains the last person executed in Louisiana, which has gone over ten years without an execution. He is also the only person to have been executed in Louisiana since 2002, when Leslie Dale Martin was executed for murder. Due to a 2012 lawsuit challenging Louisiana's lethal injection protocol and drug companies not wanting their products associated with capital punishment, Louisiana is unable to carry out executions, despite capital punishment still being a legal penalty.

In popular culture
In 2016, Courtney LeBlanc's murder case was featured on the Investigation Discovery series Deadline: Crime with Tamron Hall.

See also
 Capital punishment in Louisiana
 Capital punishment in the United States
 List of most recent executions by jurisdiction
 List of people executed in Louisiana
 List of people executed in the United States in 2010

References

1962 births
2010 deaths
20th-century American criminals
21st-century American criminals
21st-century executions by Louisiana
21st-century executions of American people
American male criminals
American people convicted of rape
American people executed for murder
American rapists
American murderers of children
Criminals from Louisiana
People convicted of murder by Louisiana
People executed by Louisiana by lethal injection
People from Denham Springs, Louisiana
People with antisocial personality disorder
People with sexual sadism disorder